Brandon King may refer to:

Brandon King (cornerback) (born 1987), American football player, formerly of the Indianapolis Colts and Jacksonville Jaguars
Brandon King (linebacker) (born 1993), American football player, currently of the Indianapolis Colts
Brandon King (cricketer) (born 1994), Jamaican cricketer